Rybno Kaszubskie is a non-operational PKP railway station on the disused PKP rail line 230 in Rybno Kaszubskie (Pomeranian Voivodeship), Poland. It is also one end of a dismantled branch line serving the Żarnowiec pumped storage power station power station and the never-completed Żarnowiec Nuclear Power Plant.

Lines crossing the station

References 
Rybno Kaszubskie article at Polish Stations Database, URL accessed at 19 March 2006

Railway stations in Pomeranian Voivodeship
Disused railway stations in Pomeranian Voivodeship
Wejherowo County